Stony Run is a tributary stream of Jones Falls in Baltimore, Maryland. The stream headwaters are in north Baltimore near the city boundary. The stream flows southward about  through several park areas - including Friends School of Batimore-and the neighborhood of Wyman Park, and enters a culvert before emptying into Jones Falls near Druid Hill Park.

References

Bodies of water of Baltimore
Rivers of Maryland